Nyctimene may mean:
Nyctimene (genus), a genus of bats in the family Pteropodidae
Nyctimene (mythology), a character in Ovid's Metamorphoses: the daughter of Epopeus, a king of Lesbos
2150 Nyctimene (1977 TA), an inner main-belt asteroid discovered in 1977 by W. Sebok at Palomar